New Tech High School at B. F. Darrell, formerly A. Maceo Smith New Tech High School, is a four-year public high school serving grades 9-12 in the Oak Cliff area of Dallas, Texas (USA). It is part of the Dallas Independent School District. It is a technology magnet school established in 2011 in the former A. Maceo Smith High School; it now occupies the former B. F. Darrell Elementary School. In 2015, the school was rated "Met Standard" by the Texas Education Agency.

The school in its initial campus was named for Antonio Maceo Smith (1903–1977), a pioneer civil rights leader in Dallas.

History
For several years, while it served as a zoned school, A. Maceo Smith High School was a Texas Education Agency "unacceptable" ranked school. In 2011 the district converted A. Maceo Smith into a technology magnet, A. Maceo Smith New Tech High School. Since Smith was reconstituted as a magnet school, it avoided the possibility of the TEA reconstituting or closing the school itself due to its poor performance as a zoned school. A part of the New Tech School Network, the conversion was funded by a $2 million bond.

Sarah Zumwalt Middle School temporarily shared the Smith building with New Tech while the permanent Zumwalt campus was being fixed. In 2018 A. Maceo Smith New Tech High School's name changed to New Tech High School at B.F. Darrell as the school swapped buildings with Barack Obama Male Leadership Academy, with the latter now at A. Maceo Smith, so New Tech now occupies the former B. F. Darrell Elementary Building.

New Tech in the news
In early 2015, drama teacher Scot Pankey, with a cast of students, made national and international headlines by performing a choreographed dance to the song "Uptown Funk" performed by Bruno Mars. As of March 11, 2019, the viral YouTube video had amassed over 14.4 million views.

References

External links

New Tech High School at Dallas Independent School District
Wilonsky, Robert. "An Early Look at "Repurposing" Plans for A. Maceo and North Dallas High Schools." Dallas Observer. Tuesday January 21, 2011.

Dallas Independent School District high schools
Public high schools in Dallas
Public magnet schools in Dallas
2011 establishments in Texas
Educational institutions established in 2011